The CEA-101 CB.1 Gaivota (Brazilian name for the seagull bird), is a single-seat sailplane of high-wing construction designed in 1963 in Brazil.

It was designed by the Portuguese engineer and professor Cláudio de Barros. The CEA-101 was of great importance for the further development of aviation in Minas Gerais. The Minas Gerais Gliding Club used the aircraft as a training aircraft until the early 1980s. After that, the CB.1 was lost in a hangar for a while. In 2001, with the help of former students of DEMEC and aviation friends of CEA, it was restored and since 2003 it is again airworthy with the registration PP-ZTZ.

Specifications

Notes

1960s Brazilian sailplanes
Aircraft first flown in 1963